Bachia remota is a species of lizard in the family Gymnophthalmidae. It is endemic to Brazil.

Description 
The snout of a bachia remota is rounded whilst the body is long and small in width. The tail is longer than the body and there are four limbs, with each limb having four digits. It also has scales along its entire body.

References

Bachia
Reptiles of Brazil
Endemic fauna of Brazil
Reptiles described in 2016
Taxa named by Marco Antônio Ribeiro Jr.
Taxa named by Marcélia Basto da Silva
Taxa named by Jucivaldo D. Lima